Athari is a surname. Notable people with the surname include:

Aristotle Athari (born 1991), American actor and comedian
Farzan Athari (born 1984), Iranian-Swedish model, actor, and TV host 
Mashallah ibn Athari ( 740–815), Persian astrologer, astronomer, and mathematician